Elizabeth Larrabee Norment (December 31, 1952 – October 13, 2014) was an American actress best known for her role as Nancy Kaufberger in the Netflix series House of Cards. She attended Yale University, and had performed in several theater roles before moving into television.

Norment went to southern California in 1983 to star in Beethoven's Tenth at the Ahmanson Theatre in Los Angeles. She remained there after the production ended. She had bit parts in films, made TV commercials, and appeared in some TV programs. She also continued to act on stage.

She died of cancer at Memorial Sloan Kettering Cancer Center in New York City, aged 61.

Filmography

Film

Television

Theater credits
Founding member, American Repertory Theatre, Cambridge MA

New York credits: http://www.lortel.org/Archives/CreditableEntity/12020

References

External links
 

1952 births
2014 deaths
American actresses
Actresses from Washington, D.C.
Yale School of Drama alumni
Deaths from cancer in New York (state)
21st-century American women